Clyne Halt railway station served the village of Clyne, in the historical county of Glamorganshire, Wales, from 1905 to 1964 on the Vale of Neath Railway.

History 
The station was opened on 1 June 1905 by the Great Western Railway. It closed on 15 June 1964. The line is currently only open to freight.

References 

 

Disused railway stations in Neath Port Talbot
Former Great Western Railway stations
Beeching closures in Wales
Railway stations in Great Britain opened in 1905
Railway stations in Great Britain closed in 1964
1905 establishments in Wales
1964 disestablishments in Wales